Ana Luís is a former economist and current President of the Legislative Assembly of the Azores.

Career
An economist, the 36-year-old Luís replaced Francisco Coelho, within the Socialist Party as their candidate for the chairmanship of the Legislature of the Azores, following the 2012 Regional Election. 
 
Following a plenary, Berto Messias, parliamentary leader of the PS Açores, declared to journalists in Horta, Faial, their support of the young politician after the meeting.

Ana Luís, had been the head of the candidates list for the Socialists on the island of Faial and presided over the Sociedade de Promoção e Reabilitação de Habitação e Infraestruturas (SPRHI), during the 14 October 2012 election, that swept a renovated PS into office, under the direction of Vasco Cordeiro. The decision was not unanimous, but obtained a "large consensus", as Messias indicated, and followed debate where many of the possible successors to Francisco Coelho (outgoing chair) were debated. of those considered for the post, there were several historically important figures from the party, including José Contente, former Regional Secretary for Science, Technology and Equipment, and also Cláudia Cardoso, ex-Regional Secretary for Education. Their spokesman also reiterated the need to renovate from within the party, as part of the decision for electing Luís.

References
Notes

Sources
 

Presidents of the Legislative Assembly of the Azores
People from Faial Island
Socialist Party (Portugal) politicians
1976 births
Living people
21st-century Portuguese economists
Portuguese women economists
21st-century Portuguese politicians
21st-century Portuguese women politicians